Robert Durden Inglis Sr. (born October 11, 1959) is an American politician who was the U.S. representative for  from 1993 to 1999 and again from 2005 to 2011. He is a moderate member of the Republican Party.  Inglis was unseated in the Republican primary runoff in 2010 by a landslide.

In 2012, Inglis launched the Energy and Enterprise Initiative, a nationwide public engagement campaign promoting conservative and free-enterprise solutions to energy and climate challenges. E&EI is based in George Mason University in Fairfax, Virginia, and attempts to build support for energy policies that are dictated by conservative concepts of limited government, big business, accountability, reasonable risk-avoidance, and free enterprise capitalism.

Early life, education, and law career

Inglis was born in Savannah, Georgia, the son of Helen Louise (née McCullough) and Allick Wyllie Inglis, Jr. His ancestry is Scottish and English. He grew up in Bluffton, South Carolina, near Hilton Head Island. He earned his undergraduate degree from Duke University in Durham, North Carolina. He obtained his Juris Doctor from the University of Virginia School of Law in Charlottesville, Virginia. Upon his graduation from law school, he worked for a number of years as a lawyer in private practice, and served on the executive committee of the Greenville County Republican Party. In 2015, he signed an amicus brief calling for the recognition of same-sex marriage.

U.S. House of Representatives

Elections
1992
Inglis made his first run for elected office when he won the Republican nomination for the 4th District.  In the general election, he defeated three-term incumbent Democrat Liz J. Patterson, who had earlier defeated Bill Workman and Knox H. White, two Republicans who were successive mayors of Greenville, with White still in the position. In this election, incumbent President George H. W. Bush carried the state with 48% of the vote, although he lost nationally, and South Carolina's majority of voters made it one of the strongest Republican-voting states. Although the 4th District had been trending Republican for some time, Patterson had deep family ties in the district as the daughter of the late, longtime U.S. Senator Olin D. Johnston. Additionally, she had won her first three terms under unfriendly conditions for Democrats.

1994–1996
Proving just how Republican this district had become, Inglis was re-elected in 1994 and 1996 with no substantive opposition, both times winning more than 70 percent of the vote.

1998
Inglis had promised during his initial bid for the seat to serve only three terms.  Accordingly, he vacated the seat in 1998 to run for the Senate against Democratic incumbent Ernest Hollings, who had been in office since 1966, as successor to Olin Johnston. Inglis gave Hollings his second close race in a row, holding the longtime Senator to 53 percent of the vote.  After losing the race, Inglis returned to work as a lawyer, practicing commercial real estate and corporate law. He was succeeded in the House by Jim DeMint, who had been an informal adviser to Inglis.

2004
In 2004, DeMint opted to run for Hollings's open Senate seat instead of seeking re-election to the House. Inglis chose to take his old House seat back.  He easily won a three-way Republican primary with 85 percent of the vote, all but assuring his return to Congress. He faced the founder of the HBCU Classic and first African American Democratic Candidate to run for South Carolina's 4th Congressional District seat Brandon P. Brown from Taylors, South Carolina in the general election. He was re-elected with little difficulty in 2006 and 2008.

2010

Inglis faced four challengers in the Republican primary—the real contest in this heavily Republican district. It was the first time he faced substantive primary opposition as an incumbent. The challengers included 7th Circuit (Spartanburg) Solicitor Trey Gowdy, state Senator David L. Thomas, college professor and former Historian of the U.S. House Christina Jeffrey, and businessman Jim Lee.

In the June 8, 2010, primary election, Inglis finished second with 27 percent of the vote, well behind first-place finisher Gowdy's 39 percent.  He was forced into a June 22 run-off election against Gowdy. Although he had "racked up a reliably conservative record" during his six terms in the house, Inglis had been criticized by his primary opponents for certain Congressional votes, including his support for the Emergency Economic Stabilization Act of 2008 (which earned him the nickname "Bailout Bob") and his opposition to the Iraq War troop surge of 2007, and was portrayed as removed from the interests of the district. Inglis had attacked Gowdy's conservatism and questioned his opponent's support for creating a costly lake in Union County, South Carolina.

In the runoff, Gowdy defeated Inglis in a landslide, 71–29 percent. Following his defeat in the Republican primary, Inglis criticized the Tea Party movement, which had supported his opponent's campaign, as well as the Republican Party for courting the movement, stating, "It's a dangerous strategy, to build conservatism on information and policies that are not credible."

Tenure
Inglis's 2010 Republican primary opponents asserted that his voting record in his second House tenure was more moderate than his first. He was one of seventeen House Republicans who voted for a Democratic resolution opposing the Iraq War troop surge of 2007, and spoke against climate change denial, offshore oil drilling and warrantless surveillance after his return to the House. In response, Inglis pointed to his 93.5% lifetime rating from the American Conservative Union and his endorsements from the National Rifle Association and National Right to Life Committee.

On climate change, Inglis said that conservatives should go with the facts, and the science, and accept the National Academy of Sciences' conclusion that climate change is caused by human activities and poses significant risks, which 97 percent of climate scientists agree with. Studies conclude that coal power plants are responsible for 23,600 premature deaths in the U.S. per year, and conservatives should hold them accountable, he said, perhaps with a carbon tax on their emissions.

Inglis is a staunch advocate of a federal prohibition of online poker.  He also supported actions to aid people in war-torn Darfur.  In 2006, he co-sponsored H.R. 4411, the Goodlatte-Leach Internet Gambling Prohibition Act and H.R. 4777, the Internet Gambling Prohibition Act. On December 27, 2008, Inglis published an op-ed in The New York Times in support of a revenue neutral carbon tax.

In October 2007, before the South Carolina 2008 Republican presidential primary, Inglis told presidential candidate Mitt Romney, a Mormon, "[Y]ou cannot equate Mormonism with Christianity; you cannot say, 'I am a Christian just like you.'" Inglis stated "If he [Romney] does that, every Baptist preacher in the South is going to have to go to the pulpit on Sunday and explain the differences."

On September 15, 2009, Inglis was one of seven Republicans to cross party lines in voting to disapprove fellow South Carolina Republican Joe Wilson for a lack of decorum during President Obama's address to a joint session of Congress. He was one of eight House Republicans to support the DREAM Act.

Committee assignments
In the 111th Congress:
Committee on Foreign Affairs
Subcommittee on Asia, the Pacific, and the Global Environment
Subcommittee on Europe
Subcommittee on the Middle East and South Asia
Committee on Science and Technology
Subcommittee on Energy and Environment (Ranking Member)
Science Subcommittee on Research and Science Education

Electoral history

South Carolina's 4th congressional district, 1992:
 Bob Inglis, Republican – 99,879 (50.3%)
 Elizabeth J. Patterson, Democrat – 94,182 (47.5%)
 Jo Jorgensen, Libertarian – 4,286 (2.2%)
 Write-in candidates – 63 (nil)

South Carolina's 4th congressional district, 1994:
 Bob Inglis, Republican – 109,626 (73.5%)
 Jerry L. Fowler, Democrat – 39,396 (26.1%)
 Write-in candidates – 154 (0.1%)

South Carolina's 4th congressional district, 1996:
 Bob Inglis, Republican – 138,165 (70.9%)
 Darrell E. Curry, Democrat – 54,126 (27.8%)
 C. Faye Walters, Natural Law – 2,501 (1.3%)

United States Senate election in South Carolina, 1998 – Republican primary:
 Bob Inglis – 115,029 (74.6%)
 Stephen Brown – 33,530 (21.8%)
 Elton Legrand – 5,634 (3.7%)

United States Senate election in South Carolina, 1998:
 Ernest Hollings, Democrat – 563,377 (52.7%)
 Bob Inglis, Republican – 488,238 (45.7%)
 Richard T. Quillian, Libertarian – 16,991 (1.6%)
 Write-in candidates – 457 (nil)

South Carolina's 4th congressional district, 2004:
 Bob Inglis, Republican – 188,795 (69.8%)
 Brandon P. Brown, Democrat – 78,376 (29.0%)
 C. Faye Walters, Green – 3,273 (1.2%)
 Write-in candidates – 150 (0.1%)

South Carolina's 4th congressional district, 2006:
 Bob Inglis, Republican – 115,553 (64.2%)
 William Griff Griffith, Democrat – 57,490 (32.0%)
 John Cobin, Libertarian – 4,467 (2.5%)
 C. Faye Walters, Green – 2,336 (1.3%)
 Write-in candidates – 85 (0.1%)

South Carolina's 4th congressional district, 2008 – Republican primary:
 Bob Inglis – 37,571 (67.0%)
 Charles Jeter – 18,545 (33.1%)

South Carolina's 4th congressional district, 2008:
 Bob Inglis, Republican – 184,440 (60.1%)
 Paul Corden, Democrat – 113,291 (36.9%)
 C. Faye Walters, Green – 7,332 (2.4%)
 Write-in candidates – 1,865 (0.6%)

South Carolina's 4th congressional district, 2010 – Republican primary:
 Trey Gowdy – 34,103 (39.2%)
 Bob Inglis – 23,877 (27.5%)
 Jim Lee – 11,854 (13.6%)
 David Thomas – 11,073 (12.7%)
 Christina Jeffrey – 6,041 (7.0%)

South Carolina's 4th congressional district, 2010 – Republican primary runoff:
 Trey Gowdy – 54,412 (70.7%)
 Bob Inglis – 22,590 (29.3%)

Awards and honors
Inglis was the recipient of the 2015 Profile in Courage Award from the John F. Kennedy Library Foundation "for the courage he demonstrated when reversing his position on climate change after extensive briefings with scientists, and discussions with his children, about the impact of atmospheric warming on our future." His embrace of the scientific evidence of climate change and advocacy for a carbon tax drew intense criticism from fellow Republicans, and Inglis was defeated in the June 2010 Republican primary.  He "figures prominently" in the 2014 Merchants of Doubt documentary as an interviewee exposing the methods of science deniers.

Personal life
Inglis and his wife Mary Anne have five grown children, and they live on a small farm near Travelers Rest, north of Greenville. He is a member of St. John in the Wilderness, an Episcopal congregation in Flat Rock, NC.

Opposition to Donald Trump
In October 2016, Inglis was one of thirty GOP ex-lawmakers to sign a public letter condemning Republican presidential candidate Donald Trump. He had previously said, in a May 2016 interview with Chris Hayes, that "under no circumstances" could he vote for Trump. Commenting on Trump's campaign after the election, Inglis said: "It's one thing to represent people and give a voice to their fears. It is quite another to amplify those fears—that is surely the worst possible kind of leadership. It's demagoguery. The real sadness for me is that we knew it, and yet we voted for it. In a very real sense, the whole country has lost this election."

Six months later, after House Speaker Paul Ryan accused Democrats of partisan bias in calling for Trump's impeachment over the firing of FBI director James Comey, then investigating possible links between Trump's campaign and Russia, Inglis chastised Ryan on Twitter, saying, "you know this isn't true" since Republicans would have had, in his opinion, ample grounds for considering impeachment if a Democratic president had done the things Trump was accused of. Reminded that he had, as a member of the House Judiciary Committee, voted to impeach President Bill Clinton in 1998, he said that was "for matters less serious than the ones before us now."

References

External links

 official campaign site
 
 

|-

|-

|-

1959 births
21st-century American politicians
American Presbyterians
Duke University alumni
Intelligent design advocates
Living people
People from Bluffton, South Carolina
People from Travelers Rest, South Carolina
Politicians from Savannah, Georgia
Presbyterians from South Carolina
Republican Party members of the United States House of Representatives from South Carolina
South Carolina lawyers
University of Virginia School of Law alumni